Michel Ferreira dos Santos (born 22 March 1990), simply known as Michel, is a Brazilian footballer who plays as a defensive midfielder for Grêmio.

Club career

Early career
Born in Rio de Janeiro, Michel started his career with São Cristóvão, being promoted to the first team at the age of just 16. He subsequently represented Porto Alegre, Madureira, Guarani de Palhoça, Imbituba, Novorizontino and Camboriú before returning to Novorizontino in 2016.

Atlético Goianiense
After impressing with Tigre, Michel signed a loan contract with Série B side Atlético Goianiense on 26 April 2016. He immediately became an undisputed starter for the side, contributing with four goals in 35 appearances and achieving top level promotion as champions.

Grêmio
On 27 December 2016, Michel was loaned to Série A club Grêmio, for one year. He made his debut in the category on 14 May, starting in a 2–0 home win against Botafogo.

Michel scored his first goals in the top tier on 8 June 2017, netting a brace in a 6–3 away defeat of Chapecoense. He ended the campaign with five goals, being crowned the year's Bola de Prata. In December, Grêmio exercised the buyout clause on his contract, and he signed a permanent two-year contract.

Michel subsequently struggled with injuries in the following years, but still renewed his contract until 2022 on 30 April 2019.

Career statistics

Honours

Club
Madureira
Copa Rio: 2012

Novorizontino
Campeonato Paulista Série A3: 2014

Atlético Goianiense
Campeonato Brasileiro Série B: 2016

Grêmio
Copa Libertadores: 2017
Recopa Sudamericana: 2018
Campeonato Gaúcho: 2018, 2019
Recopa Gaúcha: 2019, 2022

Individual
Bola de Prata: 2017

References

External links

1990 births
Living people
Footballers from Rio de Janeiro (city)
People from Rio de Janeiro (city)
Brazilian footballers
Association football midfielders
Campeonato Brasileiro Série A players
Campeonato Brasileiro Série B players
Campeonato Brasileiro Série C players
Campeonato Brasileiro Série D players
São Cristóvão de Futebol e Regatas players
Porto Alegre Futebol Clube players
Madureira Esporte Clube players
Grêmio Novorizontino players
Camboriú Futebol Clube players
Atlético Clube Goianiense players
Grêmio Foot-Ball Porto Alegrense players
Fortaleza Esporte Clube players
CR Vasco da Gama players